Bjarne Lyngstad (9 January 1901 – 4 September 1971) was a Norwegian politician for the Liberal Party.

He was born in Inderøy.

From August to September 1963 he served as the Minister of Local Government and Work Affairs during the short-lived centre-right cabinet Lyng. When another centre-right cabinet was formed in 1965, under Prime Minister Per Borten, Lyngstad was appointed Minister of Agriculture and held this position until 21 August 1970.

He was elected to the Norwegian Parliament from Nord-Trøndelag in 1961 and was re-elected on one occasion. During his stints as cabinet member, which included the entire second term, he was replaced by deputy representative Ola H. Kveli. Lyngstad had served in the position of deputy representative during the terms 1954–1957 and 1958–1961.

Lyngstad was a long-time member of the Inderøy municipality council, serving as deputy mayor in the periods 1945–1947 and 1955 to 1961 and mayor from 1947 to 1952.

References

1901 births
1971 deaths
Liberal Party (Norway) politicians
Ministers of Local Government and Modernisation of Norway
Ministers of Agriculture and Food of Norway
Members of the Storting
Mayors of places in Nord-Trøndelag
People from Inderøy
Place of death missing
20th-century Norwegian politicians